Solidago multiradiata is a species of goldenrod known by the common names Rocky Mountain goldenrod, northern goldenrod, and alpine goldenrod. It is native to North America, where it can be found throughout the northern regions, including Alaska and most of Canada (all 3 territories plus all provinces except Prince Edward Island, including territory north of the Arctic Circle. Its distribution extends through the western United States as far south as Arizona, New Mexico, and California. It is known mostly from the subalpine and alpine climates of high mountain ranges. Its habitat includes tundra and mountain meadows.

This is a perennial herb producing one or more decumbent or erect stems from a branching caudex. The stems vary in maximum length or erect height from 3 to 80 centimeters. The leaves are linear or lance-shaped, sometimes narrowing quite a bit at the bases to become spoon- or spatula-shaped. They measure up to 20 centimeters long at the base of the plant, and are smaller farther up the stem. They are mostly hairless but may have hairs lining the toothed or serrated edges. The inflorescence is a cluster of several flower heads, with clusters containing up to 100 heads. Each flower head contains many yellow disc florets and many narrow yellow ray florets each 3 or 4 millimeters long. The fruit is an achene a few millimeters in length. It is coated in rough hairs and usually has a pappus on the tip.

The plant has been noted to be among the first species to resprout after oil spills in Alaska. It is used there for revegetation projects.

References

External links
Jepson Manual Treatment
Washington Burke Museum
Callphotos Photo gallery, University of California

multiradiata
Plants described in 1789
Flora of Subarctic America
Flora of Canada
Flora of the Northwestern United States
Flora of the Southwestern United States
Flora of the South-Central United States
Flora without expected TNC conservation status